Typhoon Durian's meteorological history began with its origins as a tropical disturbance near Chuuk State on November 23, 2006, and lasted until its dissipation off the coast of Andhra Pradesh, India, on December 9. Durian formed as a tropical depression on November 25 near Chuuk State. Situated south of a ridge, the system tracked west-northwest over a region characterized by low wind shear and good upper-level divergence. Late on November 26, the depression intensified into a tropical storm and was named Durian. Steady strengthening took place over the following two days as the system approached the Philippines.

Slight weakening took place before the storm made landfall in the Bicol Region. Land interaction precipitated further degradation of storm, though it retained typhoon status upon emerging over the South China Sea on December 1. Some re-intensification occurred, with Durian reaching a secondary peak on December 3. Subsequently, increasingly hostile conditions caused the system to weaken to a tropical storm as it turned southwest. Durian struck southern Vietnam early on December 5 as a tropical storm before diminishing to a tropical depression. The system turned westward once again and crossed Malay Peninsula. Failing to reorganize, Durian degenerated into a remnant low on December 7 before ultimately dissipating two days later off the coast of Andhra Pradesh, India.

Background and origins

The 2006 Pacific typhoon season was characterized by a large number of intense typhoons despite a near-normal number of named storms. According to the Joint Typhoon Warning Center (JTWC), the year featured seven super typhoons, the third-highest since reliable records began in 1970. This was partially attributed to the presence of an El Niño, especially toward the latter half of the season. Though not a strong ENSO event, it peaked during November and coincided with a series of powerful typhoons impacting the Philippines. Meteorologist Gary Padgett regarded the event as, "a veritable parade of intense [and] destructive typhoons." The first of these storms was Typhoon Xangsane in late September which explosively intensified shortly after its formation near Samar Island. The storm killed more than 200 people in the country and inflicted 5.9 billion PHP (US$150 million) in damage. In late October, Typhoon Cimaron became one of the most intense storms to strike Luzon; however, it impacted a sparsely populated region and relatively few casualties took place. Less than three weeks later, a Typhoon Chebi followed a similar path to Cimaron, though its small size contributed to relatively limited damage. Typhoon Durian would become the fourth of these powerful storms to impact the country. The final typhoon in the "parade" was Utor in December, which was the weakest of the five and followed a more southerly track.

The origins of Typhoon Durian can be traced to a tropical disturbance that developed near Chuuk State in the Federated States of Micronesia on November 23. Initially, the system featured a broad low- to mid-level circulation and good outflow. Situated within an area of moderate wind shear, development was initially inhibited; however, following a decrease in shear on November 25, organization improved. On November 25, a tropical wave – an elongated area of low air pressure moving from east to west – interacted with the system and triggered tropical cyclogenesis. Post-storm modeling determined that this wave was an essential factor in the storm's formation and had it not formed, Durian would not have become a tropical cyclone. With convection wrapping into the storm's circulation, the JTWC classified it as a tropical depression around 1200 UTC. The Japan Meteorological Agency (JMA) followed suit three hours later. Situated south of a mid-level ridge, the system tracked generally west-northwest toward the Philippines. The depression gradually organized and gained strength, reaching tropical storm status late on November 26. At that time, the JMA assigned it the name Durian.

Peak intensity

On November 27, the JTWC noted that Durian could undergo explosive intensification as it moved over the Philippine Sea two days later, similar to what took place with Typhoons Cimaron and Chebi. However, there was less confidence in this scenario due to the presence of dry air west of the cyclone. On November 28, the Philippine Atmospheric, Geophysical and Astronomical Services Administration assigned the storm the local name Reming as it entered their area of responsibility. It was not until 0300 UTC on November 29 that the JMA also upgraded the storm. During the course of November 29, a westward-moving convectively-coupled Kelvin wave interacted with Durian and provided additional convergence around the typhoon.

By the end of the rapid intensification phase, Durian turned nearly due west as a subtropical ridge built to its north. Although expected to gradually turn northwest along the southwestern periphery of the ridge, topographical effects from the Philippines were expected to limited poleward progression. Weakening somewhat, Durian brushed the southern coast of the Catanduanes early on November 30. Gusts at the station peaked at  before the anemometer broke. This was the highest value ever recorded in the Philippines, greatly exceeding previous record of  during Typhoon Joan of 1970.

South China Sea and dissipation

Interaction with land induced steady weakening of the typhoon as it moved westward over the Philippines. The storm made two additional landfalls in Quezon and Marinduque after moving over the Ragay Gulf and Sibuyan Sea, respectively. Passing over the Isla Verde Passage, Durian emerged into the South China Sea early on December 1 as a minimal typhoon. During the storm's crossing of the Philippines, the area of deep convection surrounding the center expanded from 1.0 to 2.2 degrees to 2.2–3.0 degrees; however, unlike many other typhoons, the eye collapsed and failed to fully redevelop once clear of the islands. Gradual re-intensification occurred over the subsequent days, with the storm attaining a secondary peak strength of  early on December 3. Influenced by monsoonal flow, Durian soon turned southwestwards and began paralleling the Vietnamese coastline. Increasing wind shear and inflow of cooler air quickly weakened the system, with winds dropping below typhoon-force early on December 4. As Durian neared the coast of extreme southeastern Vietnam, a slight discrepancy in classification occurred between the JMA and the JTWC. While the former noted a steady weakening trend, the JTWC briefly re-classified Durian as a typhoon late on December 4.

Within hours of moving onshore, a combination of land interaction and poor upper-level outflow caused all deep convection to dissipate. The system degraded to a tropical depression before emerging over the Gulf of Thailand. The depression later made landfall over Surat Thani Province, Thailand early on December 6 before crossing into the Bay of Bengal. Once over water, the circulation became increasingly well-defined and convective banding reformed along the south side of the low. Environmental conditions were marginally favorable for development; however, Durian failed to reorganize further and degenerated into a remnant low late on December 7 as it moved just south of the Andaman Islands. The remnants continued generally westward across the Bay and later dissipated on December 9 off the coast of Andhra Pradesh, India.

See also

2006 Pacific typhoon season
Typhoon Durian
Typhoon Gay (1989)
Tropical Storm Linda (1997)

Notes

References

External links

Japan Meteorological Agency
Joint Typhoon Warning Center 
Philippine Atmospheric, Geophysical and Astronomical Services Administration
Typhoon2000
Vietnam's National Hydro-Meteorological Service 
Thai Meteorological Department

2006 Pacific typhoon season
Durian
Durian meteorological